Rainbow 'Round My Shoulder is a 1952 American musical film directed by Richard Quine and written by Blake Edwards and Richard Quine. The film stars Frankie Laine, Billy Daniels, Charlotte Austin, Arthur Franz, Ida Moore and Lloyd Corrigan. The film was released in September 1952, by Columbia Pictures.

Plot
Two singers help an aspiring actress whose grandmother opposes her launching a show-business career.

Cast          
Frankie Laine as Frankie Laine
Billy Daniels as Billy Daniels
Charlotte Austin as Cathy Blake
Arthur Franz as Phil Young
Ida Moore as Martha Blake
Lloyd Corrigan as Tobias aka Toby
Barbara Whiting Smith as Suzy Milligan
Ross Ford as Elliott Livermore
Arthur Space as Joe Brady

References

External links
 

1952 films
1950s English-language films
American musical films
1952 musical films
Columbia Pictures films
Films directed by Richard Quine
1950s American films